Rhinocapsus is a genus of North American plant bugs in the family Miridae. There are at least two described species in Rhinocapsus.

Species
These two species belong to the genus Rhinocapsus:
 Rhinocapsus rubricans (Provancher, 1887)
 Rhinocapsus vanduzeei Uhler, 1890 (azalea plant bug)

References

Further reading

External links

 

Phylini
Articles created by Qbugbot